Anguran and Angooran may refer to one of several locations in Iran:
 Anguran, Hormozgan
 Anguran, Bashagard, Hormozgan Province
 Anguran, Mazandaran
 Anguran, Zanjan
 Anguran District, in Zanjan Province
 Anguran Rural District, in Zanjan Province